The White Houses in Valby, also known as Trekanten (lit. "The Triangle"), is one of several developments of building society houses in the Valby district of Copenhagen, Denmark.

History

Valby Arbejderes Byggeforening ("Valby Workers' Building Society") was founded on 17 May 1898. Am approximately five-hectare, triangular site was acquired from a local farmer at the far end of Valby Langgade which was then known as Remissevej. The price was DKK 47,000. The 34-year-old architect Christian Mandrup-Poulsen was commissioned to design the development. The foundation stone for the first house was set on 26 November 1899. The building society was dissolved on 4 March 1917.

Design
Mandrup-Poulsen's plan created three tree-lined avenues. Søndre Allé, Nordre  Allé and Østre Allé, which form a large A off the south side of Valby Langgade. The development consists of a total of 81 houses of which 77 double houses and four are single houses. Each house contained two apartments, one for the owner and one for a tenant. Mandrup-Poulsen created seven different house types but all were white with red tile roofs and green window frames and fences. Most have details in red brick.

Further reading
 100 år og et kvarter. Trekroners Vejlaug. 2000

See also
 White Houses, Frederiksberg

References

External links
 Official website

Houses in Copenhagen
Buildings and structures in Valby